The  was an infantry division of the Imperial Japanese Army. Its call sign was the .It was formed on 10 July 1940 at Hirosaki, Aomori, simultaneously with 51st, 52nd, 54th, 55th, and 56th divisions, as a reserve and provisional unit. Its call-sign “Oku” was taken from the ancient name of the Tohoku region of northern Honshū, "Oshu". The formation nucleus was the headquarters of the 8th Division.  Its manpower came from the Aomori, Iwate, Yamagata and Akita prefectures. The 57th division was initially assigned to direct command of Emperor Hirohito, but was transferred to Northern District Army as soon as it formed 2 December 1940.

History
To participate in the Special exercise of the Kwantung Army (actually a mobilization for the possible large-scale conflict with the Soviet Union) together with 51st division, the 57th Division was assigned to the Kwantung Army`s 3rd army on 1 August 1941. The preparations for the war with the Soviet Union were officially cancelled 9 August 1941 though, and 57th division was reassigned to the 4th army.

During 1941-1945 the division was used to defend a Manchukuo in coastal part of Heilongjiang. In March 1945, the 57th division was replaced in Heilongjiang with the recently formed 125th division and sent to Fukuoka to eventually join 36th army protecting Tokyo region. The division nearly completed sea leg of transfer (to Fukuoka) by 18 April 1945. Due to bad developments of Battle of Okinawa, 10 May 1945 the further movement of the 57th division was cancelled and it was re-subordinated to the 16th Area Army to counter the anticipated Operation Downfall by the US forces. The division has met the day of surrender of Japan 15 August 1945 at Fukuoka without seeing any combat.

See also
 List of Japanese Infantry Divisions

Notes
This article incorporates material from Japanese Wikipedia page 第57師団 (日本軍), accessed 9 June 2016

Reference and further reading

 Madej, W. Victor. Japanese Armed Forces Order of Battle, 1937-1945 [2 vols]
Allentown, PA: 1981

Japanese World War II divisions
Infantry divisions of Japan
Military units and formations established in 1940
Military units and formations disestablished in 1945
1940 establishments in Japan
1945 disestablishments in Japan